Cronkhite (from Dutch krankheid: "illness", "disease") is an Americanized Dutch surname.

Notable individuals with the surname:

People 
 Adelbert Cronkhite (1861–1937), United States Army general
 Bernice Cronkhite (1893–1983), American academic
 Kendal Cronkhite, American production designer

See also 
 Cronkite, a surname
 Fort Cronkhite, former US Army post in California named for Major General Adelbert Cronkhite

Surnames of Dutch origin
Americanized surnames
Surnames from nicknames